Measure Map Pro format (MMP) is an XML notation to store GIS information in two-dimensional or three-dimensional maps. It was created by Blue Blink One to store information about Polygons, Polylines and Spots including georeferenced labelling, grids and comments.

Structure 

The MMP file includes a set of geometries (Polygon, Polylines, Spots) that can be represented on a map and are georeferenced using WGS84 coordinates. It includes RGB colors for lines and areas and information associated to the geometries.

An example MMP document is:

<?xml version="1.0" encoding="UTF-8"?>
<POLYGONS>
	<DATE>Nov 4, 2019 at 12:06:52 PM</DATE>
	<POLYGON>
		<NAME>Polygon 1</NAME>
		<DESCRIPTION>This is polygon 1</DESCRIPTION>
		<ISHOLE>0</ISHOLE>
		<BLOCKED>1</BLOCKED>
		<SHAPE>0</SHAPE>
		<NOSURFACE>0</NOSURFACE>
		<SHOWPINS>0</SHOWPINS>
		<SHOWDISTANCES>1</SHOWDISTANCES>
		<LINECOLOR>0</LINECOLOR>
		<LINECUSTOMCOLOR>FF0000</LINECUSTOMCOLOR>
		<LINEWIDTH>3</LINEWIDTH>
		<AREACOLOR>1</AREACOLOR>
		<AREACUSTOMCOLOR>0000FF</AREACUSTOMCOLOR>
		<AREATRANSPARENCY>7</AREATRANSPARENCY>
		<SHOWNAME>1</SHOWNAME>
		<SHOWAREAMEASURE>1</SHOWAREAMEASURE>
		<SHOWPERIMETERMEASURE>1</SHOWPERIMETERMEASURE>
		<COORDINATEPOLYGONLABELLATITUDE>39.483491319510904</COORDINATEPOLYGONLABELLATITUDE>
		<COORDINATEPOLYGONLABELLONGITUDE>-0.38401111640411045</COORDINATEPOLYGONLABELLONGITUDE>
		<COORDINATEPERIMETERLABELLATITUDE>-0.62838414457228</COORDINATEPERIMETERLABELLATITUDE>
		<COORDINATEPERIMETERLABELLONGITUDE>0.0</COORDINATEPERIMETERLABELLONGITUDE>
		<COORDINATEAREALABELLATITUDE>-1.099626787266999</COORDINATEAREALABELLATITUDE>
		<COORDINATEAREALABELLONGITUDE>0.0</COORDINATEAREALABELLONGITUDE>
		<POINTS>
			<POINT>
				<LAT>39.483425319129395</LAT>
				<LONG>-0.38431018270924255</LONG>
			</POINT>
			<POINT>
				<LAT>39.48365200038984</LAT>
				<LONG>-0.38408890046557076</LONG>
			</POINT>
			<POINT>
				<LAT>39.483490528882754</LAT>
				<LONG>-0.38371205009897835</LONG>
				<DESCPOINT>
					<SHOWDESC>1</SHOWDESC>
					<SHOWDESCINREPORT>1</SHOWDESCINREPORT>
					<DESC>This is a description</DESC>
					<DESCLAT>39.483490528882754</DESCLAT>
					<DESCLONG>-0.38371205009897835</DESCLONG>
				</DESCPOINT>
			</POINT>
			<POINT>
				<LAT>39.48333063863197</LAT>
				<LONG>-0.38400522864250775</LONG>
			</POINT>
			<POINT>
				<LAT>39.483425319129395</LAT>
				<LONG>-0.38431018270924255</LONG>
			</POINT>
		</POINTS>
		<GRID>
			<CELLWIDTH>3.048000000000003</CELLWIDTH>
			<CELLHEIGHT>3.048000000000003</CELLHEIGHT>
			<BEARING>0.0</BEARING>
			<REFLATITUDE>39.48348022551208</REFLATITUDE>
			<REFLONGITUDE>-0.38402675914213347</REFLONGITUDE>
			<SHOWGRID>1</SHOWGRID>
		</GRID>
	</POLYGON>
	<POLYGON>
		<NAME>Polygon 3</NAME>
		<ISHOLE>0</ISHOLE>
		<BLOCKED>1</BLOCKED>
		<SHAPE>0</SHAPE>
		<NOSURFACE>0</NOSURFACE>
		<SHOWPINS>0</SHOWPINS>
		<SHOWDISTANCES>1</SHOWDISTANCES>
		<LINECOLOR>0</LINECOLOR>
		<LINECUSTOMCOLOR>FF0000</LINECUSTOMCOLOR>
		<LINEWIDTH>3</LINEWIDTH>
		<AREACOLOR>1</AREACOLOR>
		<AREACUSTOMCOLOR>0000FF</AREACUSTOMCOLOR>
		<AREATRANSPARENCY>7</AREATRANSPARENCY>
		<SHOWNAME>1</SHOWNAME>
		<SHOWAREAMEASURE>1</SHOWAREAMEASURE>
		<SHOWPERIMETERMEASURE>0</SHOWPERIMETERMEASURE>
		<COORDINATEPOLYGONLABELLATITUDE>39.48394123166483</COORDINATEPOLYGONLABELLATITUDE>
		<COORDINATEPOLYGONLABELLONGITUDE>-0.38271287370835694</COORDINATEPOLYGONLABELLONGITUDE>
		<COORDINATEPERIMETERLABELLATITUDE>0.0</COORDINATEPERIMETERLABELLATITUDE>
		<COORDINATEPERIMETERLABELLONGITUDE>0.0</COORDINATEPERIMETERLABELLONGITUDE>
		<COORDINATEAREALABELLATITUDE>39.48385075907382</COORDINATEAREALABELLATITUDE>
		<COORDINATEAREALABELLONGITUDE>-0.38271287370835694</COORDINATEAREALABELLONGITUDE>
		<POINTS>
			<POINT>
				<LAT>39.48410602155221</LAT>
				<LONG>-0.38301848908864145</LONG>
			</POINT>
			<POINT>
				<LAT>39.4842805036605</LAT>
				<LONG>-0.3825395521091366</LONG>
			</POINT>
			<POINT>
				<LAT>39.48377773550993</LAT>
				<LONG>-0.38240725832807243</LONG>
			</POINT>
			<POINT>
				<LAT>39.48360195966916</LAT>
				<LONG>-0.38291298898477066</LONG>
			</POINT>
			<POINT>
				<LAT>39.48410602155221</LAT>
				<LONG>-0.38301848908864145</LONG>
			</POINT>
		</POINTS>
		<GRID>
			<CELLWIDTH>6.096000000000006</CELLWIDTH>
			<CELLHEIGHT>6.096000000000006</CELLHEIGHT>
			<BEARING>0.0</BEARING>
			<REFLATITUDE>39.48388639368251</REFLATITUDE>
			<REFLONGITUDE>-0.38272089261207287</REFLONGITUDE>
			<SHOWGRID>1</SHOWGRID>
		</GRID>
	</POLYGON>
	<SPOT>
		<NAME>spot 1</NAME>
		<SHOWNAME>1</SHOWNAME>
		<ICON>0</ICON>
		<LAT>39.48380422970726</LAT>
		<LONG>-0.3833288364170926</LONG>
		<COORDINATESPOTNAMELATITUDE>39.483762826883066</COORDINATESPOTNAMELATITUDE>
		<COORDINATESPOTNAMELONGITUDE>-0.3833288364170926</COORDINATESPOTNAMELONGITUDE>
		<ALT>-0.3833288364170926</ALT>
	</SPOT>
	<SPOT>
		<NAME>Spot 2</NAME>
		<SHOWNAME>1</SHOWNAME>
		<ICON>0</ICON>
		<LAT>39.483327514732565</LAT>
		<LONG>-0.3835867896154639</LONG>
		<COORDINATESPOTNAMELATITUDE>39.48331716395788</COORDINATESPOTNAMELATITUDE>
		<COORDINATESPOTNAMELONGITUDE>-0.3835867896154639</COORDINATESPOTNAMELONGITUDE>
		<ALT>-0.3835867896154639</ALT>
	</SPOT>
</POLYGONS>

Geodetic reference systems in MMP 

For its reference system, MMP uses 3D geographic coordinates: longitude, latitude and altitude, in that order, with negative values for west, south and below mean sea level if the altitude data is available. The longitude, latitude components (decimal degrees) are as defined by the World Geodetic System of 1984 (WGS84). The vertical component (altitude) is measured in meters from the WGS84 EGM96 Geoid vertical datum.

See also 
 Keyhole Markup Language
 Geography Markup Language
 Geospatial content management system
 Google Earth
 GPS eXchange Format
 GeoJSON

External links 
 MMP format 

XML
GIS vector file formats
GIS file formats